Thomas Konusi (born 11 June 1996), is a Samoan international footballer who plays as a forward for Mount Albert-Ponsonby. He is the son of Victor Lagi who played for the Fiji national squad

Konusi was educated at Saint Kentigern College in Auckland, New Zealand. After playing soccer at school he moved on to play for Three Kings United in the 2015/16 season. In December 2015 he was found to have been ineligible to play, resulting in the results of eight matches being overturned.

In June 2019 he was named to the Samoa national football team for the 2019 Pacific Games.

International statistics

References

1996 births
Living people
People educated at Saint Kentigern College
Samoan footballers
Samoan expatriate footballers
Samoa international footballers
Association football midfielders
Mount Albert-Ponsonby players
Samoan expatriate sportspeople in New Zealand
Expatriate association footballers in New Zealand